is a train station in Chūō-ku, Kobe, Hyōgo Prefecture, Japan。

Lines
Kobe Municipal Subway
Kaigan Line Station K03

Layout
The station has an island platform that serves two tracks.

Gallery 

Stations of Kobe Municipal Subway
Railway stations in Hyōgo Prefecture
Railway stations in Japan opened in 2001